Thomas Michael Donahue (May 23, 1921 – October 16, 2004) was an American physicist, astronomer, and space and planetary scientist.

Donahue graduated in 1942 from Rockhurst College in Kansas City, Missouri and received in 1947 his PhD in physics from Johns Hopkins University, with an interruption of his graduate studies by WW II and service in the Army Signal Corps.

According to the Fall 2004 newsletter of the University of Michigan's Department of Atmospheric, Oceanic and Space Sciences, Donahue said:

Upon his death, he was survived by his wife, three sons, and six grandchildren.

Awards and honors
1959 — elected a Fellow of the American Physical Society
1981 — honorary doctorate from Rockhurst College
1981 — Arctowski Medal from the National Academy of Sciences
1981 — John Adam Fleming Medal from the American Geophysical Union
1983 — elected to the National Academy of Sciences
1986 — elected to the International Academy of Astronautics
1986 —  Henry Russel Lectureship at the University of Michigan
1994 — U. of Michigan's Attwood Award for excellence in research

References

External links
Thomas M. Donahue | Faculty History Project | University of Michigan
BHL: Thomas M. Donahue papers 1939–2002, U. of Michigan's Bentley Historical Library

1921 births
2004 deaths
20th-century American physicists
American astronomers
Rockhurst University alumni
Johns Hopkins University alumni
University of Pittsburgh faculty
University of Michigan faculty
Fellows of the American Academy of Arts and Sciences
Fellows of the American Physical Society
Members of the United States National Academy of Sciences
United States Army personnel of World War II